Casa da Música is a station of the Porto Metro. The architect of the station is Eduardo Souto de Moura. It is located in Boavista between Carolina Michaëlis and Francos and named after Casa da Música, located nearby. The station serves Lines A, B, C, E and F. It has two side platforms.

The station was open on 7 December 2002 as a part of the stretch between Senhor de Matosinhos and Trindade, currently known as Line A. Line B started operation on 13 March 2005, Line C on 30 July 2005, Line E on 27 May 2006, and Line F on 2 January 2011.

Plans were announced in 2017 to build an underground Line G which would connect Casa da Música with São Bento. The construction is to be started in 2019 and is planned to take three years.

References

External links

Porto Metro stations
Eduardo Souto de Moura buildings
Modernist architecture in Portugal
Railway stations opened in 2002